Bipartite may refer to:

 2 (number)
 Bipartite (theology), a philosophical term describing the human duality of body and soul
 Bipartite graph, in mathematics, a graph in which the vertices are partitioned into two sets and every edge has an endpoint in each set
 Bipartite uterus, a type of uterus found in deer and moose, etc.
 Bipartite treaty, a treaty between two parties

See also 
 Dichotomy